"The Will to Believe" is a lecture  by William James, first published in 1896, which defends, in certain cases, the adoption of a belief without prior evidence of its truth. In particular, James is concerned in this lecture about defending the rationality of religious faith even lacking sufficient evidence of religious truth. James states in his introduction: "I have brought with me tonight ... an essay in justification of faith, a defense of our right to adopt a believing attitude in religious matters, in spite of the fact that our merely logical intellect may not have been coerced. 'The Will to Believe,' accordingly, is the title of my paper."

James' central argument in "The Will to Believe" hinges on the idea that access to the evidence for whether certain beliefs are true depends crucially upon first adopting those beliefs without evidence. As an example, James argues that it can be rational to have unsupported faith in one's own ability to accomplish tasks that require confidence. Importantly, James points out that this is the case even for pursuing scientific inquiry. James then argues that like belief in one's own ability to accomplish a difficult task, religious faith can also be rational even if one at the time lacks evidence for the truth of one's religious belief.

The lecture

James' "The Will to Believe" and William K. Clifford's essay "The Ethics of Belief" are touchstones for many contemporary debates over evidentialism, faith, and overbelief. James' "The Will to Believe" consists of introductory remarks followed by ten numbered but not titled sections. In his introductory remarks, James characterizes his lecture by stating that he had "brought with me tonight ... an essay in justification of faith, a defense of our right to adopt a believing attitude in religious matters, despite our merely logical intellect may not have been coerced." "The Will to Believe", accordingly, is the title of my paper." At the end of his introductory remarks, James leads into his first section by stating that he "must begin by setting up some technical distinctions."

Sections I–III: Preliminaries

In section I, James embarks upon the task of defining a number of important terms he will be relying upon throughout the lecture:
 Live and dead hypotheses – "deadness and liveness ... are measured by [a thinker's] willingness to act. The maximum of liveness in a hypothesis means willingness to act irrevocably"
 Option – "the decision between two hypotheses"
 Living and dead option – "a living option is one in which both hypotheses are live ones"
 Forced and avoidable option – an option for which there is "no possibility of not choosing"
 Momentous and trivial option – an "option is trivial when the opportunity is not unique, when the stake is insignificant, or when the decision is reversible if it later proves unwise"
 Genuine option – "we may call an option a genuine option when it is of the forced, living, and momentous kind"
 Belief – "A chemist finds a hypothesis live enough to spend a year in its verification: he believes in it to that extent."

In section II, James begins by saying he will then consider "the actual psychology of human opinion." Here James considers and largely agrees with the criticism of Pascal's Wager that we either should not or are unable to believe or disbelieve at will. That is, James here seems to reject doxastic voluntarism, "the philosophical doctrine according to which people have voluntary control over their beliefs." In section III, however, James qualifies his endorsement of this criticism of Pascal's Wager by arguing that "it is only our already dead hypotheses that our willing nature is unable to bring to life again." By which James means that it is only things we already disbelieve that we are unable to believe at will.

Section IV: Thesis

In his very brief section IV, James introduces the main thesis of the work:

However, instead of providing an argument for this thesis, James quickly ends this section by stating that he must still "indulge in a bit more of preliminary work."

Sections V–VII: More preliminaries

In section V, James makes a distinction between a skepticism about truth and its attainment and what he calls "dogmatism": "that truth exists, and that our minds can find it." Concerning dogmatism, James states that it has two forms; that there is an "absolutist way" and an "empiricist way" of believing in truth. James states: "The absolutists in this matter say that we not only can attain to knowing truth, but we can know when we have attained to knowing it, while the empiricists think that although we may attain it, we cannot infallibly know when." James then goes on to state that "the empiricist tendency has largely prevailed in science, while in philosophy the absolutist tendency has had everything its own way."

James ends section V by arguing that empiricists are really no more tentative about their beliefs and conclusions than the absolutists: "The greatest empiricists among us are only empiricists on reflection: when left to their instincts, they dogmatize like infallible popes. When the Cliffords tell us how sinful it is to be Christians on such "insufficient evidence", insufficiency is really the last thing they have in mind. For them the evidence is absolutely sufficient, only it makes the other way. They believe so completely in an anti-Christian order of the universe that there is no living option: Christianity is a dead hypothesis from the start."

James begins section VI with the following question: "But now, since we are all such absolutists by instinct, what in our quality of students of philosophy ought we to do about the fact? Shall we espouse and endorse it?" He then answers: "I sincerely believe that the latter course is the only one we can follow as reflective men. ... I am, therefore, myself a complete empiricist so far as my theory of human knowledge goes."

James ends section VI by stressing what he finds to be the "great difference" merit of the empiricist way over the absolutist way: "The strength of his system lies in the principles, the origin, the terminus a quo [the beginning point] of his thought; for us the strength is in the outcome, the upshot, the terminus ad quem [the end result]. Not where it comes from but what it leads to is to decide. It matters not to an empiricist from what quarter a hypothesis may come to him: he may have acquired it by fair means or by foul; passion may have whispered or accident suggested it; but if the total drift of thinking continues to confirm it, that is what he means by its being true."

James begins section VII by stating that there is "one more point, small but important, and our preliminaries are done." However, James in fact gives in this section a crucial bit of argumentation:

Sections VIII–X: Main argument

In section VIII, James finally moves beyond what he considers mere preliminaries. Here James first identifies areas of belief where he holds that to believe without evidence would be unjustified: "Wherever the option between losing truth and gaining it is not momentous, we can throw the chance of gaining truth away, and at any rate save ourselves from any chance of believing falsehood, by not making up our minds at all till objective evidence has come. In scientific questions, this is almost always the case ... The questions here are always trivial options, the hypotheses are hardly living (at any rate not living for us spectators), the choice between believing truth or falsehood is seldom forced." James concludes this section by asking us to agree "that wherever there is no forced option, the dispassionately judicial intellect with no pet hypothesis, saving us, as it does from dupery at any rate, ought to be our ideal."

In section IX, James moves to investigate whether there are areas of belief where belief without evidence would be justified. James gives self-fulfilling beliefs as one example of such beliefs:

From examples like these, James concludes: "There are, then, cases where a fact cannot come at all unless a preliminary faith exists in its coming. And where faith in a fact can help create the fact, that would be an insane logic which should say that faith running ahead of scientific evidence is the "lowest kind of immorality" into which a thinking being can fall."

James begins section X with the thesis that he takes himself to have already proven: "In truths dependent on our personal action, then, faith based on desire is certainly a lawful and possibly an indispensable thing." James then goes on to argue that, like the examples he gave in section IX, religious belief is also the sort of belief that depends on our personal action and therefore can also justifiably be believed through a faith based on desire:

Although James does not here explain the way in which the truth or evidence regarding religious belief depends upon our first having religious belief, he does argue that it is a part of the religious belief itself that its own truth or the evidence of its own truth depends upon our first believing it. In the preface to the published version of "The Will to Believe" James offers a different argument for the way in which the evidence for religion depends upon our belief. There he contends that it is through the failure or thriving of communities of religious believers that we come to have evidence of the truth of their religious beliefs. In this way, to acquire evidence for religious belief, we must first have believers who adopt such belief without sufficient evidence. Much later in life, in his "Pragmatism: A New Name for Some Old Ways of Thinking" lectures, James also mentions the possibility that God's existence may actually depend upon our belief in his existence.

The doctrine
The doctrine James argues for in "The Will to Believe" appears often in both his earlier and later work. James himself changed the name of the doctrine several times. First appearing as "the duty to believe", then "the subjective method", then "the will to believe", it was finally recast by James as "the right to believe." Whatever the name, the doctrine always concerned the rationality of believing without evidence in certain instances. Specifically, James is defending the violation of evidentialism in two instances:
 Hypothesis venturing (see hypothetico-deductivism) – beliefs whose evidence becomes available only after they are believed
 Self-fulfilling beliefs – beliefs that by existing make themselves true.

After arguing that for hypothesis venturing and with self-fulfilling beliefs a person is rational to believe without evidence, James argues that a belief in a number of philosophical topics qualifies as one or other of his two allowed violations of evidentialism (e.g. free will, God, and immortality). The reason James takes himself as able to rationally justify positions often not believed to be verifiable under any method, is how important he thinks believing something can be for the verifying of that belief. That is to say, in these cases James is arguing that the reason evidence for a belief seems to be unavailable to us is because the evidence for its truth or falsity comes only after it is believed rather than before. For example, in the following passage James utilizes his doctrine to justify a belief that "this is a moral world":

It cannot then be said that the question, "Is this a moral world?" is a meaningless and unverifiable question because it deals with something non-phenomenal. Any question is full of meaning to which, as here, contrary answers lead to contrary behavior. And it seems as if in answering such a question as this we might proceed exactly as does the physical philosopher in testing an hypothesis. ... So here: the verification of the theory which you may hold as to the objectively moral character of the world can consist only in this—that if you proceed to act upon your theory it will be reversed by nothing that later turns up as your action's fruits; it will harmonize so well with the entire drift of experience that the latter will, as it were, adopt it. ... If this be an objectively moral universe, all acts that I make on that assumption, all expectations that I ground on it, will tend more and more completely to interdigitate with the phenomena already existing. ... While if it be not such a moral universe, and I mistakenly assume that it is, the course of experience will throw ever new impediments in the way of my belief, and become more and more difficult to express in its language. Epicycle upon epicycle of subsidiary hypothesis will have to be invoked to give to the discrepant terms a temporary appearance of squaring with each other; but at last even this resource will fail. (—William James, "The Sentiment of Rationality")

The doctrine James developed in his "The Will to Believe" lecture was later extended by his protégé F. C. S. Schiller in his lengthy essay "Axioms as Postulates". In this work, Schiller downplays the connection between James' doctrine and religious positions like God and immortality. Instead, Schiller stresses the doctrine's ability to justify our beliefs in the uniformity of nature, causality, space, time, and other philosophic doctrines that have generally been considered to be empirically unverifiable.

Criticism
James' doctrine has taken a lot of criticism. In 1907 University of Michigan Professor Alfred Henry Lloyd published "The Will to Doubt" in response, claiming that doubt was essential to true belief.

Charles Sanders Peirce ends his 1908 paper "A Neglected Argument for the Reality of God" complaining generally about what other philosophers had done with pragmatism, and ends with a criticism specifically of James' will to believe:

It seems to me a pity they [pragmatists like James, Schiller] should allow a philosophy so instinct with life to become infected with seeds of death in such notions as that of the unreality of all ideas of infinity and that of the mutability of truth, and in such confusions of thought as that of active willing (willing to control thought, to doubt, and to weigh reasons) with willing not to exert the will (willing to believe).

Bertrand Russell in "Free Thought and Official Propaganda" argued that one must always adhere to fallibilism, recognizing of all human knowledge that "None of our beliefs are quite true; all have at least a penumbra of vagueness and error", and that the only means of progressing ever-closer to the truth is to never assume certainty, but always examine all sides and try to reach a conclusion objectively.

Walter Kaufmann wrote:

Instead of admitting that some traditional beliefs are comforting, James argued that "the risk of being in error is a very small matter when compared with the blessing of real knowledge", and implied that those who did not accept religious beliefs were cowards, afraid of risking anything: "It is like a general informing soldiers that it is better to keep out of battle forever than to risk a single wound" (Section VII).

James' appeal depends entirely on blurring the distinction between those who hold out for 100 percent proof in a matter in which any reasonable person rests content with, let us say, 90 percent, and those who refuse to indulge in a belief which is supported only by the argument that after all it could conceivably be true.

Some specific objections to James' doctrine include:

 the necessity of positing a hypothesis without personally adopting it as a belief
 the epistemological problems of belief voluntarism
 success in the world verifies a belief, rather than restricting verification to predictive success
 the separation of belief adoption from truth and epistemic justification

James addresses objection (1) in a footnote of his "The Will to Believe" essay where he argues that for a chemist to devote years of his life to verifying a hypothesis, the chemist must also believe his hypothesis. However, the chemist adopting a hypothesis to guide years of study is certainly only a special case of hypothesis adoption. A more general defense of (1) could also be constructed from James' behaviorist theory of belief. James takes believing a proposition to consist in acting as if it were true, so if James considers testing a proposition as acting as if it were true to see if it leads to successful action, then James would be committed to seeing an act of hypothesis adoption as necessarily an act of belief adoption as well.

Objection (2) seems to presuppose the ability to will a belief. James believed that when evidence was insufficient to determine the truth or falsehood of a proposition, this uncertainty allowed a person to be able to will a belief by acting as if that belief were true. Objection (2) warrants further discussion over "voluntarism".

Objection (3) strikes at James' pragmatic theory of truth, which his will to believe doctrine seems to presume. James' main defense of his theory of truth is his claim that no other account of "truth" or "correspondence" or "agreement with reality" can be given except for the pragmatist account. James sees traditional accounts of truth as explaining one mysterious term ("truth") with nothing more than equally mysterious terms (e.g. "correspondence"). The only sense James believes we can make of the concept of "truth" is if we count as true the beliefs that lead us to perform actions that "agree" with the world. Those that fit with the world will lead to successful action, those that do not agree with the world will entail actions that lead to failure (e.g. if one believes he can fly, he'll jump off a building). With truth analyzed in this way, James sees no reason to restrict success to predictive success (objection (3)) and is fully comfortable with the fact that certain beliefs will lead one person to success in the world while failing someone else (objection (4)). However, this reply to both objections is not open to James since he explicitly claims that his will to believe doctrine does not depend on his pragmatist theory of truth.

See also
 American philosophy
 Fideism
 Pascal's wager
 Pragmatism
 Prudentialism

References

External links
"The Will to Believe" by William James
Expressivist analysis of James' essay.
 "James' Will to Believe Argument" entry from Just the Arguments: 100 of the Most Important Arguments in Western Philosophy, Edited by Michael Bruce and Steven Barbone. First Edition. Blackwell Publishing Ltd. Published 2011.

1896 speeches
1896 essays
Epistemology literature
Essays by William James
Philosophy of religion literature
Modern philosophical literature
Epistemology of religion
Criticism of rationalism